Carnivore is the first studio album by the American crossover thrash band Carnivore. It was released in 1985 through Roadrunner Records.

The album was first released on CD in 1990 in original form, and again in 1991 without track 5 but with most of the songs from the 1987 Retaliation album. It was reissued on January 23, 2001, with an addition of three bonus demo tracks and with a different album cover. These songs would be officially recorded later to appear on their next album.

Reception 

In August 2014, Revolver placed the album on its "14 Thrash Albums You Need to Own" list.

Track listing 
Music and lyrics by Peter Steele.

"Predator" (4:33)
"Carnivore" (3:22)
"Male Supremacy" (7:31)
"Armageddon" (4:14)
"Legion of Doom" (3:31)
"God Is Dead" (4:13)
"Thermonuclear Warrior" (5:38)
"World Wars III and IV" (10:13)
"U.S.A. for U.S.A." (demo) (3:32) – reissue only
"S.M.D." (demo) (2:17) – reissue only
"Sex and Violence" (demo) (5:19) – reissue only

Personnel 
Lord Petrus Steele – vocals, bass, sound effects (credited as Petrus T. Steele on the 1990 CD version)
Keith Alexander – guitar, vocals, sound effects
Louis Beateaux – drums, percussion, vocals, sound effects

Production
Produced by Norman Dunn (bonus tracks produced by Peter Steele)
Engineered by Norman Dunn
Mixedby Norman Dunn & Michael Marciano
Remastered by George Marino

References 

1986 debut albums
Carnivore (band) albums
Roadrunner Records albums